Luc Boltanski (born 4 January 1940) is a French sociologist, Professor at the School for Advanced Studies in the Social Sciences, Paris, and founder of the Groupe de Sociologie Politique et Morale, known as the leading figure in the new "pragmatic" school of French sociology. His work has significantly influenced sociology, political economy and social history.

Work 
Boltanski contributed to the start of the "political and moral sociology" framework. Political and moral sociology has gradually developed as a research programmein the sense proposed by Imre Lakatosaround a conceptual nucleus looking to construct a theory of action based on Émile Durkheim's theory of moral fact, revising the inheritance of ‘methodological structuralism’ from the point of view of dynamics and processes.  The research program stresses how, in many conflicts, the characteristics of the disputants change during the course of the conflict. This work has influenced research on civic culture within and beyond French sociology.

Boltanski's most recent work deals with the links between detective novels and the emergence of the nation state.

On Justification 
A book co-authored with Laurent Thévenot, On Justification: The Economies of Worth, 2006 (French original: 1991), argues that modern societies are not a single social order but an interweaving of multiple orders. Boltanski and Thévenot identify six "orders of worth" or "economies of worth," systematic and coherent principles of evaluation. These multiple orders (civic, market, inspired, fame, industrial, and domestic) are not associated with particular social domains but coexist in the same social space—as Boltanski and Thévenot persuasively demonstrate through a content analysis of texts used in managerial training in contemporary French corporations.

Central to On Justification is the notion  of "test" to indicate forms of conflict among the actors with a variable degree of legitimacy (chap. 5). If the experiences following one another in conflict processes are legitimate, they firmly bind actors to claim the universality of their reasoning in accord with the order of worth they refer to. If, however, the agents in conflict refer to different order of worth (e.g. to that of the civic polity and to that of the industrial polity), legitimate tests are not available. But if the agents are nevertheless oriented towards a notion of the common good (which belongs to neither of the conflicting polities), an (albeit fragile) "compromise" may evolve to settle the dispute (chap. 10). The notion of workers' rights is an example of such a compromise between the industrial and the civic orders (p. 325). These compromises are always fragile because attempts to define the common good, on which the compromise rests, are bound to re-ignite the conflict (p. 278).

The New Spirit of Capitalism 
The New Spirit of Capitalism, 2005  (French original: 1999), co-authored with Ève Chiapello, explores a seventh "projective city" (organized around the concept of flexible networks now prominent in the conception of "the project"). While On Justification was based on an analysis of major texts of political philosophy, this book is based on a systematic analysis of managerial literature from the 1960s and 1990s and aims "to describe the 'residue', which cannot be interpreted in the language of the six existing cities" (p. 24).

The Enrichment Economy 
By ‘enrichment economy’, Boltanski and Esquerre (2014, 2016) designate a development of capitalism based on tourism, luxury, art and heritage. The term ‘enrichment’ does not refer to the growth of private fortunes, but rather to the processes that increase the value of objects. Boltanski and Esquerre define value as the justification for price. Any object can be enriched, however ancient or modern it is, and the enrichment can be physical or cultural, through the use of a narrative device. At the heart of this ‘enrichment economy’ is the ‘collection form’, which makes room in the capitalist cosmos for increasing the value of things from the past and things that, though they may be recent, are treated as if they were destined to become immortal.

Selected publications 
Boltanski, L., Thévenot, L. 1983, "Finding One's Way in Social Space : A Study based on Games", Social Science Information, 22 (4-5), p. 631-680.
Boltanski, L., 1987 [1982], The Making of a Class. Cadres in French Society, Cambridge (UK), Cambridge University Press.
Boltanski, L., 1999, Distant Suffering: Morality, Media and Politics, Cambridge (UK), Cambridge University Press.
Boltanski, L., Thévenot, L., 1999, "The Sociology of Critical Capacity", European Journal of Social Theory, vol. 2, n° 3, August, p. 359-378.
Boltanski, L., 2000, "The Legitimacy of Humanitarian Actions and Their Media Representation: the Case of France", Ethical Perspectives, vol.7, n° 1, p. 3-16.
Boltanski, L.,  Thévenot, L., 2000, "The reality of moral expectations: a sociology of situated judgment", Philosophical Explorations, vol. III, n° 1.
Boltanski, L., Chiapello È., Ross G., Piore M. J., Reid D., Kogut B., 2000, "Forum: Le Nouvel Esprit du capitalisme", French Politics, Culture & Society, vol. 18, n° 3, Fall.
Boltanski, L. 2002, "The Left After May 1968 and the Longing for Total Revolution", Thesis Eleven, 69: 1–20.
Boltanski, L., Chiapello (Ève), 2005 [1999],The New Spirit of Capitalism, London-New York, Verso, 2005.
Boltanski, L., Chiapello (Ève), 2005, "The Role of criticism in the dynamics of capitalism", in: Worlds of Capitalism: Institutions, Economics, Performance and Governance in the Era of Globalisation, Max Miller (Ed), London, Routledge.
Boltanski, L., Thévenot, L., 2006 [1991], On Justification. The Economies of Worth, Princeton, Princeton University Press.
Boltanski, L., Nuits, Lyon, ENS Editions, 2008. Note du metteur en scène, Guillaume Pfister. Première création française : avril-mai 2008 au Théâtre Kantor (Lyon) - l'Ecole Normale Supérieure Lettres et Sciences Humaines.
Boltanski, L., 2011 [2009], On Critique - a Sociology of Emancipation, Cambridge (UK), Polity Press.
Boltanski, L., 2012 [1990], Love and Justice as Competences - Three Essays on the Sociology of Action (translated by Catherine Porter), Cambridge (UK), Polity Press.
Boltanski, L., 2014 [2012], Mysteries and Conspiracies - Detective Stories, Spy Novels and the Making of Modern Societies (translated by Catherine Porter), Cambridge (UK), Polity Press.
Boltanski, L., Fraser (Nancy), Corcuff (Philippe), 2014, Domination et émancipation. Pour un renouveau de la critique sociale, Lyon, Presses Universitaires de Lyon.
Boltanski, L., Esquerre A., 2014, "La « collection », une forme neuve du capitalisme. La mise en valeur économique du passé et ses effets" (""Collection", a New Form of Capitalism"), Les Temps Modernes, 3/2014 (n°679), p. 5-72.
Boltanski, L., Esquerre A., 2016, "The Economic Life of Things", New Left Review (98) : 31-54.

References

Further reading 
T. Bénatouil, A Tale of Two Sociologies: The Critical and Pragmatic Stance in Contemporary French Sociology, in European Journal of Social Theory, n° 2, pp. 279–396, 1999;
Silber I., Pragmatic Sociology as Cultural Sociology: Beyond Repertoire Theory?, in European Journal of Social Theory, n° 6, pp. 427–49, 2003.
Boltanski L., Vitale,T. 2006, Una sociologia politica e morale delle contraddizioni, in Rassegna Italiana di Sociologia, n° 1, pp. 91–116.
Wagner P., 1994, “Dispute, Uncertainty and Institution in Recent French Debates”, Journal of Political Philosophy, n° 2, pp. 270–289.
Wagner P., 1999, "After Justification. Registers of Evaluation and the Sociology of Modernity", European Journal of Social Theory, vol. 2, n° 3, pp. 341–57.
Borghi V., Vitale T., 2007, "Convenzioni, economia morale e ricerca sociologica", in Borghi, Vando e Vitale (a cura di), Le convenzioni del lavoro, il lavoro delle convenzioni, numero monografico di Sociologia del Lavoro, n. 104, Franco Angeli, Milano.
Molinatto P., 2008, "Boltanski e le aporie antropologiche del liberalismo", in Materiali per una storia della cultura giuridica, n°1, 2008, pp. 143–174.
Dromi, S. M., Illouz, E., 2010, "Recovering Morality: Pragmatic Sociology and Literary Studies", New Literary History, n° 41(2), pp. 351–369.
 Susen, S. & Turner, B.S. (red.) 2014. The Spirit of Luc Boltanski. Essays on the	'Pragmatic Sociology of Critique'. London: Anthem Press.

1940 births
Living people
French business theorists
French sociologists
French people of Corsican descent
French people of Ukrainian-Jewish descent
Academic staff of the School for Advanced Studies in the Social Sciences